Count Valerian Aleksandrovich Zubov (1771–1804) was a Russian general who led the Persian Expedition of 1796. His siblings included Platon Zubov and Olga Zherebtsova.

As a young man Zubov had flattering prospects of a brilliant military career due to his brother Platon's ascendancy at Catherine II's court. He was reputed by contemporaries as "the handsomest man in Russia". The legend has it that the aged Empress flirted with him, secretly from his brother.

During her reign he was much lionized as a military hero of incredible valor. He was appointed General-Major and sent to assist Suvorov in quelling the Kościuszko Uprising in Poland, where he was said to treat both the Polish noblemen and their wives brazenly and "in the most lowly manner". During this stay in Poland, he married Teodor Lubomirski's granddaughter and lost his left leg in the autumn of 1794 while crossing the Western Bug, as he was wounded by a cannonball.

Several months before Catherine's death, 24-year-old Zubov was invited to take charge of the army heading for Persia. The expedition, launched in 1796, initially under the motto of complying to the promise Russia had made 23 years earlier to Georgia to protect it against any Persian attempts to bring the country under its hegemony again, was now just one of another wars for regional hegemony that was going on for a long time between Turkey, Persia, and Imperial Russia.

Zubov started the expedition much promising, seizing Derbent in Dagestan in April, and Baku by July of the same year the invasion started. Catherine waxed jubilant at his rapid progress, which in two months repeated some of the gains of Peter the Great during the Russo-Persian War (1722-1723). By November, they were stationed at the confluence of the Araks and Kura Rivers, poised to attack mainland Iran. It was in that month that the Empress of Russia died and her successor Paul I, who detested the Zubovs and had other plans for the army, ordered the troops to retreat back to Russia. Zubov's return from his luckless expedition occasioned an ode by Derzhavin, meditating on the fleeting nature of fortune and success.

References

Sources 

Imperial Russian Army generals
Members of the State Council (Russian Empire)
Russian people of the Kościuszko Uprising
People of the Russo-Persian Wars
1771 births
1804 deaths
Recipients of the Order of St. George of the Second Degree
Recipients of the Order of St. George of the Third Degree
Valerian